Petr Aleksandrovich Levanidov (24 June 1864, Arkhangelsk Governorate — 1937, Arkhangelsk) was a head of a volost (volostnoy starshina) and deputy of the Fourth Imperial Duma from the Arkhangelsk Governorate between 1912 and 1917. After the February Revolution of 1917, he became a commissar of the Provisional Government.

Biography 
Peter Levanidov was born on 24 June 1864, in Klimovskaya village of in the Shenkursk uyezd (Arkhangelsk Governorate) in a peasant family: his father was Alexander Stepanovich Levanidov, a volost clerk. Peter got only an initial (home) education, since the nearest school was as far as 20 versts from the village. Between 1887 and 1889, he served as a clerk in the village; then, for almost 17 years, he was the forestry inspector. In 1905, during the peasant unrest of the Russian Revolution, he had to leave the service.

After that Levanidov became a head of his volost (volostnoy starshina) – according to the Arkhangelsk governor, Petr Levanidov was "an ordinary peasant, underdeveloped, right [in political views]". On 20 October 1912 he was elected to the Fourth Imperial Duma from the Arkhangelsk Governorate. Despite the governor's opinion, in the IV Duma, he joined the faction of the Constitutional Democratic Party – he also became a member of a number of Duma commissions. Later he joined the Progressive Bloc.

Levanidov negatively spoke about the progress of the Stolypin agrarian reform – in June 1913, protesting against the violence, which in practice was accompanied its conduct, he claimed:

After the February Revolution of 1917, Petr Aleksandrovich received the post of a commissar of the Provisional Committee of the State Duma and the Provisional Government of Russia in Arkhangelsk Governorate. Already in March, he traveled to his homeland – Shenkursk – with the aim of organizing a new government "on the ground".

After the October Revolution, Levanidov lived in Shenkursk; at the end of January 1919, he moved with his family to Arkhangelsk. During the Soviet era, he was persecuted by the Bolshevik authorities. He died in 1937.

Family 
According to 1912 data, Peter Levanidov was married and had four children (two sons).

References

Literature 
 
 
 

1864 births
1937 deaths
People from Arkhangelsk Oblast
People from Shenkursky Uyezd
Russian Constitutional Democratic Party members
Members of the 4th State Duma of the Russian Empire
Russian Provisional Government